Jones Hill is a rural locality in the Gympie Region, Queensland, Australia.

Geography
It is for the most part sparsely populated, although a settlement on Mary Valley Road contains a primary school  and park.

History
Jones Hill State School opened on 29 January 1902.

At the  Jones Hill had a population of 550 people.

Heritage listings 
Jones Hill has the following heritage listings:

 Waterworks Road: Jones Hill Reservoir
 Waterworks Road: Waterworks Pump House
 17 McIntosh Creek Road: Jones Hill School

Education 
Jones Hill State School is a government primary (Prep-6) school for boys and girls at 21 McIntosh Creek Road. In 2017, the school had an enrolment of 399 students with 28 teachers (25 full-time equivalent) and 19 non-teaching staff (12 full-time equivalent). It includes a special education program.

There is no secondary school in Jones Hill; the nearest secondary schools are in Gympie.

References

Suburbs of Gympie
Localities in Queensland